Last Day on Earth  is a collaborative album between Welsh rock multi-instrumentalist John Cale, and American singer-songwriter Bob Neuwirth. It was released in 1994 on MCA Records. Recording of the album was completed in February 1994.

Cale later said, "Superficially, I was thinking of it as a kind of a Brechtian landscape, and there were also elements of Blade Runner in it. There's a contradiction between all the longing that's going on - the lonesome kind of qualities – and the fact that it's a crowded piece, all the songs are sung by different characters."

Track listing
All songs written by John Cale and Bob Neuwirth.

Personnel
John Cale − vocals, keyboard, viola
Bob Neuwirth − vocals, banjo, harmonica
Michael Brook − infinite guitar
David Tronzo − guitar
Eric Sanko − bass
Gerry Hemingway − percussions, sampling
Ben Perowsky − drums
Jenni Muldaur − guest vocals
Soldier String Quartet
 Dave Soldier − violin, string arrangements
 Lisa R. Gutkin − violin
 Alicia A. Svigals − violin
 Dawn M. Buckholz − cello
Technical
Roger Moutenot – engineer, mixing
Andy Green – production assistance
Taki Ono, Ayako Nagano – cover design
Tanadori Yokoo – cover art

References 

John Cale albums
Bob Neuwirth albums
1994 albums
MCA Records albums
Albums produced by John Cale
Albums produced by Bob Neuwirth